Cidália Manuel Chaúque Oliveira (born 1972) is a Mozambican politician. In January 2015 Filipe Nyusi appointed her Minister of Gender, Children and Social Welfare in the Cabinet of Mozambique.

References

1972 births
Living people
Government ministers of Mozambique
Women government ministers of Mozambique
Date of birth missing (living people)
Place of birth missing (living people)